Bramber Castle is a Norman motte-and-bailey castle formerly the caput of the large feudal barony of Bramber long held by the Braose family. It is situated in the village of Bramber, West Sussex, near the town of Steyning, overlooking the River Adur.

History

Surveys indicate the Normans were the first to build a fortification in the area, around 1070. It served as the administrative hub of the newly created Rape of Bramber, and controlled the River Adur estuary. The castle was held by William de Braose, 1st Lord of Bramber, whose family originated from Falaise. 

Except for a short period when it was confiscated by King John (1199–1216), the castle remained in the de Braose family, until the male line died out in 1326, and it passed to the Mowbrays. Bramber was one of the poorest parts of Sussex, and while it remained a centre of administration, the Mowbrays did not live there; by the 1550s, it was recorded as 'the late castle', used for grazing.

During the First English Civil War, Bramber was held by a Parliamentary garrison, under James Temple and Simon Lentner. In December 1643, a skirmish took place nearby, when a Royalist force unsuccessfully tried to secure the bridge over the River Adur. However, it is unclear whether the castle itself was occupied, while there is no evidence to support a local myth its associated church was used as a gun position.

Description
Little survives of the original structure, as much of the stone was later used to construct the bridge, and other buildings in the village. The castle was excavated in 1966–1967, with another minor survey in 1987; these indicate most of it was built between 1073 to 1130. The addition of an outer ditch around 1209 caused the collapse of much of the original curtain wall in the early 16th century. 

The most prominent remaining feature is the gatehouse tower, which still stands to almost its full height; a window, and floor joist holes are clearly visible. Beyond it are the foundations of what is believed to have been the living quarters and a guardhouse. The original gatehouse appears to have converted into a single tower at some point in the 12th century; another 3 metres were added to its height, while the entrances were blocked up. This coincides with an increased threat during the reign of John.

The dressed pillars of an entrance can be identified, but the bulk of the remaining walls now consist of only the basic rough stone infill. Situated to the north of the gatehouse is the original castle motte, its earthen mound rising to a height of some 30 ft (10 m). A short distance away is a section of the curtain wall which survives to a height up to 10 ft (3 m) in places.

There is also a small church located next to the entrance; originally constructed for the castle's inhabitants, it remains in use today.

Later structures
During World War II, two pillboxes were constructed on the castle site, which have since been removed.

References

Sources
 
 
 
 
 
Fry, Plantagenet Somerset, The David & Charles Book of Castles, David & Charles, 1980.

External links
 
 History of Bramber Castle - English Heritage
 Heritage Trail - Archived English Heritage page on Wayback Machine
 History of Sussex

Tourist attractions in West Sussex
Castles in West Sussex
Ruins in West Sussex
English Heritage sites in West Sussex
Horsham District